Carla Arocha (born October 30, 1961) is a Venezuelan artist recognized for her work grounded in Minimalism, design, and geometric abstraction, specifically examples from her native Venezuela. She lives and works in Antwerp. Her work has been exhibited internationally since the mid-1990s.

Education 
Carla Arocha obtained a Bachelor of Science from Saint Xavier University (SXU) in 1986. After training as a biologist she changed course to pursue her passion for art. She obtained a Bachelor of Fine Arts degree from the School of the Art Institute of Chicago (SAIC) in 1991 and a Master of Fine Arts from the University of Illinois at Chicago (UIC) in 1994.

Work 

Arocha first made her mark in the mid-1990s with a series of works borrowing from art, fashion, and biology. For example, her drawing Aqua Trace (1998) presents the visual melding of two distinct patterns: leopard spots and blood cells. Rendered in a bright shade of aqua, the two converging patterns are reminiscent of the animal prints found on fabric. Aqua Trace relates to an installation by Arocha entitled Hide (1997) for the Museum of Contemporary Art, Chicago, and which featured leopard-print patterns created with mirrored Plexiglas. The mirrored Perspex patterns comprising Hide adorned the walls of Chicago's Museum of Contemporary Art like a spectacular jewelled accessory, clusters of reflective plastic shimmering and swaying in the white gallery.

Conversely to her sharp opulent Plexiglas installations and kinetic mobiles, Carla Arocha's paintings are flat and pale although the artist’s constant preoccupation with ornament lies beneath the minimal framework. For example, Arocha filled the hard-edged contour of a simple pitched-roof dwelling with bold, meandering loops in House (1999). Two large vertical paintings on canvas made by artist in 1999, entitled Blind Folded and Flare, perfectly echo the artist's passion for pattern, glamour and the superfluous. In these pieces, monochrome fields camouflage dots, diamonds and organic patterns are combined. Carla Arocha’s innate flair for extravagance is only hinted at through subtle shifts in the reflective character of the paint.

In 2006, Carla Arocha started working in collaboration with Stéphane Schraenen. Today, the artist-duo Arocha & Schraenen continues to produce pieces, exchange ideas and works in progress, before completing the final artworks together.

Exhibitions 
After moving to Chicago, Arocha had her first American solo museum show at the El Museo del Barrio museum in New York in 1996. In 1997, Arocha first showed her work in a gallery at Chicago’s Rhona Hoffman Gallery. From September 1997 to March 1998, Bloomfield Hills Cranbrook Art Museum  (Michigan) organized Arocha's Carla Preiss: Somewhere. In 1997, when the MCA Museum of Contemporary Art in Chicago commissioned a solo project for its main entrance hall, Carla Arocha produced a piece made up of clusters of leopard-print patterns created with mirrored Plexiglas that can be reconfigured upon each installation. In 2001-2002, Arocha created a new artwork entitled Rover for the café windows of the MCA within the context of the Hide installation, then already part of the MCA Collection.

In Europe, Carla Arocha’s work has been shown in major solo exhibitions in various renowned institutions, including Antwerp’s Museum van Hedendaagse Kunst Antwerpen (MuHKA) in 2005–2006, and the Fonds régional d'art contemporain d'Auvergne, Clermont-Ferrand in 2006. In 2006, Bern’s Kunsthalle (Switzerland) organized Arocha's first major retrospective in Europe: Carla Arocha: Dirt, which was on show from April to May. Curated by the then director of the Kunsthalle Bern, Philippe Pirotte, and Jesús Fuenmayor in close collaboration with the artist, this major retrospective shed light on the various facets of her work. On the occasion of this show, Carla Arocha asked Stéphane Schraenen to produce a number of artworks. This exchange of ideas would mark the starting point of a long term collaboration that continues to this day.

Since 2006, pieces resulting from Arocha's collaboration with Stéphane Schraenen are exhibited under the name of Carla Arocha & Stéphane Schraenen in such museums as London’s Wallace Collection (2011), Centro de Arte Contemporáneo de Caja de Burgos (CAB) in Spain (2012); Berlin’s Künstlerhaus Bethaniën (2012); and Mechelen’s Cultuurcentrum in Belgium, (2014).

Solo exhibitions (selection)
Carla Arocha: Chris (in collaboration with Stéphane Schraenen) at  Fonds régional d'art contemporain Auvergne, Clermont-Ferrand, 2006
Carla Arocha (in collaboration with Stéphane Schraenen) at Koraalberg, Antwerp, 2006
Dirt at Kunsthalle Bern, Bern, 2006
Smoke at Galería OMR, Mexico City, 2004
By chance at  Monique Meloche Gallery, Chicago, 2003
Rover at Objectif Exhibitions, Antwerp, 2002
Underground at Monique Meloche Gallery, Chicago, 2001
Zipper at Dorothée De Pauw Gallery, Brussels, 2000
Hover: New Work at Kavi Gupta Gallery (formerly Vedanta Gallery), Chicago, 1999
Somewhere, at Cranbrook Art Museum, Blomfield Hills, 1998
Hide & Rover at MCA Museum of Contemporary Art, Chicago, 1997, and 2001-2002 
Gate at Hermetic Gallery, Milwaukee, 1997
Carla Preiss: New Work at Rhona Hoffman Gallery, Chicago, 1996-1997
Portrait: A Site-Specific Installation by Carla Preiss at the El Museo del Barrio, New York, 1996

Collections 
Arocha's work is part of several the public collections of various museums in the United States, Europe, and South America, including New-York’s MoMA; Chicago’s Museum of Contemporary Art; the Art Institute of Chicago; Antwerp’s Museum of Contemporary Art; Bern's Kunsthalle Bern in Switzerland; the Fonds régional d'art contemporain d'Auvergne, Clermont-Ferrand; the Fundación Banco Mercantil, Caracas; and Boca Raton Museum of Art, Boca Raton in Florida, US.

Personal life 
Born in Venezuela (Caracas), Arocha grew up in a family of lawyers whose passion for the humanities and culture strongly influenced her education. Moreover, the rich legacy of modern and contemporary art of her home country and plethora artists such as Jesús Rafael Soto, Carlos Cruz-Diez and Alejandro Otero, to name just a few, left a profound mark on the artist, who was enthralled by the architecture and public artworks scattered through Caracas. In December 1979, Arocha moves Chicago, where she studies biology and art and married to David Preiss. In 1995, a year after graduating from the University of Illinois at Chicago, she meets Belgium painter Luc Tuymans as he was preparing his first American show at Chicago’s Renaissance Society. In 1999, four years later, Arocha moved to Belgium and married Tuymans. The couple lives and works in Antwerp.

Publications 

For information about Carla Arocha's work in collaboration with Stéphane Schraenen see:
 Arocha, Carla, Schraenen Stéphane, and Kate Christina Mayne. (2014). Persiana: Carla Arocha - Stéphane Schraenen: Cultuurcentrum Mechelen . Antwerpen, Belgium: Ludion. 
 Fuemayor, Jesús. (2016).Flujo Disperso / Blurry Flux: Carla Arocha & Stéphane Schraenen Colectión Mercantil . Caracas: Mercantil Arte y Cultura A.C.
 Pratt, Ken, Helen Anne Molesworth, Irmgard Hölscher, Katharina Pencz, Magda Walicka, Carla Arocha, and Stéphane Schraenen. ( 2013). What Now? Carla Arocha - Stephane Schraenen . .After: Carla Arocha & Stéphane Schraenen . Burgos: Obra Social De La Caja De Burgos.

See also 
 List of Venezuelans
 List of Latin American artists
 List of Venezuelan women artists

References

Further reading 
For information about the work of Carla Arocha see:

External links 

 
 Article by Michelle Grabner entitled Carla Arocha
 Article by Jean-Charles Vergne entitled Carla Arocha: Chris

Venezuelan contemporary artists
Living people
1961 births
Venezuelan women artists
Artists from Caracas
Saint Xavier University alumni
University of Illinois Chicago alumni
School of the Art Institute of Chicago alumni
Venezuelan expatriates in Belgium
Venezuelan expatriates in the United States